Donald L. Shanks (born February 26, 1950) is an American actor and stuntman, known for his role as Michael Myers in Halloween 5: The Revenge of Michael Myers, and Nakoma, the Native American friend of the title character in the 1977 television series The Life and Times of Grizzly Adams.

Biography
Shanks was born in Piasa, Illinois in 1950. Shanks portrayed Michael Myers in Halloween 5: The Revenge of Michael Myers. In 2006, he appeared as Ben Willis, the infamous serial killer in the film I'll Always Know What You Did Last Summer. Shanks, who is of Cherokee and Illini descent, appeared in the film The Last Sin Eater as a Native American chief. It was released in the U.S. on February 9, 2007.

Filmography

Actor
Smothered (2016) - Self
Little Bear and the Master (2008)
The Last Sin Eater (2007) - Indian Chief
I'll Always Know What You Did Last Summer (2006) (V) - Ben Willis / The Fisherman
Urban Legends: Bloody Mary (2005) (V) - Coach Jacoby
No Dogs Allowed (2002) - Junior
Touched by an Angel (2001) (TV series) - Guard #1
Water with Food Coloring (2001) - Thug
Twice Today (2001) - Joe Oliver
Primary Suspect (2000) - (Chief) Lance
The Crow: Salvation (2000) - Guard #1
Ride with the Devil (1999/I) - George
Made Men (1999) - Caleb
The Tempest (1998) (TV) - Overseer
Legion of Fire: Killer Ants! (1998) (TV) - Greywolf
Truth or Consequences, N.M. (1997) - Vago Wiseguy #3
Walking Thunder (1997) - Blood Coat
Last Resort (1996) - Walking Far
Unforgivable (1996) (TV) - George
3 Ninjas Knuckle Up (1995) (as Donald L. Shanks) - Charlie
Dumb and Dumber (1994) - Third Waiter
The Legend of Wolf Mountain (1993) - Simcoe
The ButterCream Gang in Secret of Treasure Mountain (1993) (V) - Indian holding an axe
Wind Dancer (1993) - Halfmoon
The Secret Of Lost Creek (1992) (TV series) - Charlie Little Elk
The Indian Runner (1991) - Young Indian Runner
Tripwire (1990) - Indian Fighter
Halloween 5: The Revenge of Michael Myers (1989) (as Donald L. Shanks) - Michael Myers/Man in Black
Spirit of the Eagle (1989) - Running Wolf
Stranger on My Land (1988) (TV) - Construction Worker #1
Louis L'Amour's Down the Long Hills (1986) (TV) - Ashawakie
Silent Night, Deadly Night (1984) (as Donald L. Shanks) - Santa Climbing in Window
Sweet Sixteen (1983) - Jason Longshadow
Revenge of the Ninja (1983) - Chief
Legend of the Wild (1981) -
The Ghost Dance (1980) (as Donald L. Shanks) - Excavation Worker
The Incredible Hulk (1979) (TV series) - Little Jim
The Chisholms (1979) (mini TV series) - Enapay
How the West Was Won (1979) (TV series) - Red Kettle
The Life and Times of Grizzly Adams (1977–1978) (TV series) - Nakoma
The Last of the Mohicans (1977) (TV) - Uncas
Guardian of the Wilderness (1976) - Teneiya
The Adventures of Frontier Fremont (1976) -
The Life and Times of Grizzly Adams (1974) - Nakoma

External links

Don Shanks – The New York Times Article

1950 births
Living people
American male film actors
American male television actors
20th-century American male actors
21st-century American male actors
Male actors from Illinois
Native American male actors
American people of Cherokee descent
People from Macoupin County, Illinois
American stunt performers